Domingo is a Spanish name based on Latin Dominicus meaning 'of the Lord'. Related names include Dominic, Domingos, Domingues, and Domínguez. 

Notable people named Domingo include:

People with the given name 
Domingo Alaba Obende (born 1954), businessman and public servant
Domingo Alzugaray (1932–2017), Argentine-born Brazilian actor and journalist 
Domingo Amaizón (born 1936), Argentine middle-distance runner
Domingo Amestoy (1822–1892), Basque sheepherder, and banker
Domingo Andrés (1525–1599), Spanish humanist, writer and poet
Domingo Arenas (1888–1918), Mexican revolutionary
Domingo Báñez (1528–1604), Spanish Dominican and Scholastic theologian
Domingo Barrera (born 1943), Spanish boxer
Domingo Barret, governor of Yucatán, Mexico
Domingo Blanco (born 1995), Argentine footballer
Domingo Bordaberry (1889–1952), Uruguayan lawyer and political figure
Domingo Bryant (born 1963), American football player
Domingo Casco (born 1948), Argentine boxer
Domingo Castillejo (1744–1793), Spanish botanist, surgeon, and professor
Domingo Caycedo (1783–1843), Colombian statesman
Domingo Chavez (Tom Clancy universe), character
Domingo Cirici Ventalló (1878–1917), a Spanish novelist, editor and political militant
Domingo Cisma (born 1982), Spanish footballer
Domingo Colín (born 1952), Mexican racewalker
Domingo Cordero (born 1965), Puerto Rican track and field athlete
Domingo Cruz (1864–1934),19th-century Puerto Rican musician and director
Domingo Cullen (1791–1839), governor of province of Santa Fe, Argentina, during 1838
Domingo Damigella (born 1968), former featherweight boxer from Argentine
Domingo Deluana (died 2000), marine of the Philippine Marine Corps
Domingo Dominguín (1895–1958), Spanish bullfighter
Domingo Drummond (1957–2002), Honduran footballer
Domingo Elías (1805–1867), interim President of Peru in 1844
Domingo Emanuelli, Puerto Rican lawyer and politician 
Domingo Federico (1916–2000), Argentine bandoneon player, songwriter, and actor
Domingo García (fencer) (1895–?), Spanish fencer
Domingo García (footballer) (1904–?), Peruvian football midfielder
Domingo García (politician), Texas politician
Domingo Ghirardelli (1817–1894), Italian-American chocolatier
Domingo González (1947–1979), Colombian footballer
Domingo Gribeo (1558–1649), Spanish military man
Domingo Hindoyan (born 1980), Venezuelan-Swiss conductor
Domingo Hospital (born 1958), Spanish professional golfer
Domingo Itchon (1924–2004), Filipino business executive
Domingo Iturrate Zubero (1901–1927), a Spanish Roman Catholic priest
Domingo Kamonga (born 1974), Namibian rugby lock
Domingo Laíno (born 1935), Paraguayan politician, economist, and activist
Domingo G. Landicho (born 1939), Philippine writer and academic
Domingo Larrainzar (born 1969), Spanish retired footballer
Domingo Lejona (born 1938), Argentine former footballer
Domingo Leyba (born 1995), Dominican baseball infielder
Domingo Lorenzo (1928–2009), Dominican sports shooter
Domingo Matheu (1766–1831), former Argentinian president
Domingo Melín (died 1880), Mapuche chief
Domingo Ortiz (born 1952), American musician
Domingo F. Periconi (1883–?), artist
Domingo Ramón (born 1958), Spanish long-distance runner
Domingo Francisco Sánchez (1795–1870), Vice President of Paraguay
Domingo Santana (born 1992), Dominican professional baseball player
Domingo Faustino Sarmiento (1811–1888), former Argentinian president)
Domingo Tapia (born 1991), Dominican professional baseball player

People with the surname
Alberto Domingo, Spanish engineer
Alejandro Santo Domingo (born 1977), Colombian-American financier and philanthropist
Amalia Domingo Soler (1835–1909), Spanish writer
Anni Domingo (born 1950s), British actress, director and writer
Baldwin Domingo (1926-2020), American politician
Charles Domingo (1875–1950)
Cogie Domingo (born 1985), Filipino actor and model
Colman Domingo (born 1969), American actor, writer and director
David Fernández Domingo (born 1977), Spanish former cyclist
Eugene Domingo (born 1971), Filipino actress
José L. Domingo (born 1951), Spanish toxicologist
Kim Domingo (born 1995), Filipino actress, model and TV host
Marta Domingo (born 1935), Mexican soprano and opera director
Pascale Domingo, French aerothermochemist
Plácido Domingo (born 1941), Spanish opera singer and conductor
Robi Domingo (born 1989), Filipino actor, dancer, and host
Thomas Domingo (born 1985), French rugby union player
Wilfred Adolphus Domingo (1889–1968), Jamaican activist and journalist

Other people with the name 
Domingo (producer) (born 1970), American hip-hop producer
Saint Dominic (Domingo Félix de Guzmán; 1170–1221), Castilian Catholic priest, founder of the Friars popularly called the Dominicans
Juan Domingo Perón (1895–1974), 41st President of Argentina

References

See also
 Domingos (name)
 Domingo (disambiguation)
 Txomin

Spanish masculine given names